The Postal Museum is a museum specialising in philately, located in the General Post Office, Dhaka, Bangladesh.

The Postal Museum was inaugurated in 1985 but it was not so popular.

References

Philatelic museums
Museums in Dhaka
Museums established in 1966